Connor Knapp (born May 1, 1990) is an American professional ice hockey goaltender.  Knapp was selected by the Buffalo Sabres in the 6th round (164th overall) of the 2009 NHL Entry Draft and played two games in the NHL, both for the Sabres in 2014.

Playing career

Knapp won the State Championship in 2005 with McQuaid Jesuit High School, which he attended for his freshman and sophomore year. He played four seasons with the Miami RedHawks men's ice hockey team of the Central Collegiate Hockey Association (CCHA).

On April 3, 2012, Knapp signed a two-year entry level contract with the Buffalo Sabres of the National Hockey League (NHL) and was assigned to their AHL affiliate, the Rochester Americans.

On April 12, 2014, Knapp made his NHL debut when he entered the Buffalo Sabres' net, in relief of the injured Matt Hackett, with 11:35 remaining in a 4–1 loss to the Boston Bruins. By dressing Knapp for the game, he became the ninth goaltender to dress for the Sabres during the 2013–14 NHL season (sixth to play) and established the NHL record for most goaltenders dressed by one team in a single season. Knapp played the entirety of the Sabres' final game of the season against the New York Islanders, a 4–3 shootout loss.

Knapp was designated a restricted free agent, but was not tendered an offer by the Buffalo Sabers prior to the 2014–15 season. On August 6, 2014, as an unrestricted free agent, he signed a one-year AHL contract with the Lehigh Valley Phantoms.

After two seasons within the Lehigh Valley Phantoms organization in which he spent the majority of his tenure with ECHL affiliate, the Reading Royals, Knapp left as a free agent to sign a one-year deal with fellow ECHL club, the Norfolk Admirals, on September 14, 2016. In the 2016–17 season, Knapp appeared in 14 games with the Admirals with just 2 wins before he was released on December 19, 2016.

Career statistics

Awards and honours

References

External links
 

1990 births
Living people
Alaska Aces (ECHL) players
American men's ice hockey goaltenders
Buffalo Sabres draft picks
Buffalo Sabres players
Florida Everblades players
Greenville Road Warriors players
Lehigh Valley Phantoms players
Miami RedHawks men's ice hockey players
Norfolk Admirals (ECHL) players
People from York, New York
Reading Royals players
Rochester Americans players